Białe Jezioro is a lake in Poland, Pomeranian Voivodship, in Bytów County, with an area of the lake 95,200 m.²

The lake is in the source area of the Wieprza river.

See also 
 Białe Jezioro (disambiguation)

Lakes of Poland
Lakes of Pomeranian Voivodeship